Established in 1948, Mr. Bronsplein is a large sports complex located on the Gemenelandsweg, in Paramaribo, Suriname.

History
Before World War II the field was already used for association football matches, and was known in the Sranantongo language as "Lanti Djari". In 1946 the initiative was taken to introduce organized matches and competitions to the field by Frits Juda. J. Sleur and Walther. Between 1946 and 1952 organized matches were held on the pitch, with the introduction of the Bronsplein Sport Bond organizing committee in 1952.

On 23 February 1948 the complex was officially named the Mr. Bronsplein Sportterrein, named after colonial governor  who was governor of Surinam from 20 September 1945 to 5 July 1948. The board of directors of the Sport terrain at the time were P.H. Emanuels (chairman), J. Sleur (secretary), A. Holland (treasurer), L. Wijks, and F. Juda en Hooten (commissioners). Both Ajax and SV Arsenal were able to win national championship titles as tenants of the Bronsplein; Ajax in 1926–27, 1928–29, 1929–30 and SV Arsenal in 1938–39, 1939–40 seasons.

Notable tenants

Ajax
Arsenal
Benjamin Boys
Elto
Haiti
Hercules
Hooper
Jong Atlas
KMD (Klein Maar Dapper)
MYOB (Mind Your Own Business)
Nautico
Read Cirkel
Remo
Rijper Jeugd
Rijzende Zon
Rosario
Toreno
Victoria

Notable former players
Notable players who began their career on the Mr. Bronsplein

 Frans Berggraaf
 Humbert Boerleider
 Ronald Breinburg
 Paul Degenaar
 Stanley Duyzer
 August Fo-A-Man
 Iwan Fränkel
 Jacques Alex Hasselbaink
 Leo Kogeldans
 Ronald Kolf
 Stanley Krenten
 Michel Kruin
 Jules Lagadeau
 Ludwig Mans
 Charley Marbach
 Leo Marcet
 Frank Mijnals
 Humphrey Mijnals
 Ewald Oniel
 Frits Purperhart
 Herman Rijkaard
 Frank Rigters
 Edwin Schal
 Leo Schipper
 Armand Sahadewsing
 Wilfred Slengard
 Erwin Sparendam
 Eugene Testing
 Roy Vanenburg
 Bill Waterval

Players who began their career on the Mr. Bronsplein and played in the Eredivisie in the Netherlands
 Ronald Breinburg (GVAV 1963–70)
 Iwan Fränkel (Blauw-Wit 1962–64)
 Leo Kogeldans (VVV-Venlo 1957–59)
 Michel Kruin (USV Elinkwijk 1957–61, DOS 1961–64)
 Jules Lagadeau (PSV 1964–65)
 Charley Marbach (USV Elinkwijk 1956–61)
 Frank Mijnals (USV Elinkwijk 1957–60)
 Humphrey Mijnals1 (USV Elinkwijk 1962–64, DOS 1964–66)
 Herman Rijkaard (Blauw-Wit 1957–61)
 Armand Sahadewsing (DWS 1967–68)
 Erwin Sparendam (USV Elinkwijk 1957; 1959–61, Blauw-Wit 1957–58; 1961–64)

1. Humphrey Mijnals was also capped for the Netherlands national football team, before opting to play for Suriname instead.

References

External links
 

Football venues in Paramaribo
Athletics (track and field) venues in Suriname
Multi-purpose stadiums in Suriname
Buildings and structures in Paramaribo
Sports venues completed in 1948
1948 establishments in Suriname